Penrith Nepean United Football Club, originally the Penrith Panthers, was an Australian association football club based in St Marys, New South Wales.

History
The club was originally known as Penrith Panthers. It rose to the New South Wales First Division in 1996 and again to the New South Wales Super League in 2000. The club became Penrith Nepean United from 2004.

From 2007, the club was promoted to the New South Wales Premier League, the highest level of competitive football (soccer) in New South Wales. United finished its last season in 2009 on ninth place amongst twelve participants, and ceased operations after this.

The club hosted its home games at Penrith Stadium, which from 2006 was named by sponsorship as Credit Union Australia (CUA) Stadium.

Notable people
Kyah Simon, later a Matildas player, moved to the club from the Hills Brumbies early in her career.

References

External links
 Penrith Nepean United FC (archived)
 Tony Persoglia: Penrith Nepean United: First Grade Divisional History, Ozfootball Net.

Soccer clubs in New South Wales
Association football clubs established in 1957
1957 establishments in Australia
Penrith, New South Wales